The Dynali H2S is a Belgian helicopter, designed by Jacky Tonet and produced by Dynali of the Thines district of Nivelles. When it was available the aircraft was supplied as a kit for amateur construction or fully assembled, supplied ready-to-fly.

By December 2017 the design was no longer advertised on the company website and production has most likely ended.

Design and development
The H2S was designed to comply with the amateur-built aircraft rules, but a light-sport aircraft category version, the Dynali H3, is also being developed. It features a single main rotor, a two-seats-in side-by-side configuration enclosed cockpit with a windshield, skid-type landing gear and a four-cylinder, liquid cooled four-stroke,  Subaru EJ25 automotive conversion engine.

The aircraft fuselage is made from a combination of aluminium tubing and welded stainless steel, covered with a polycarbonate fairing. The tail rotor is of an enclosed Fenestron type with eight blades.

Like many helicopters designed in France and Russia, the main rotor blades advance to the left.

Variants
Kit version
Dynali H3 EasyFlyer
Lightened version powered by a four cylinder, air and liquid-cooled, four-stroke, dual ignition  Rotax 912S or a turbocharged  Rotax 914 engine for the light-sport aircraft category.

Specifications (H2S)

See also

References

External links

 

H2
2000s Belgian sport aircraft
2000s Belgian helicopters
Homebuilt aircraft
Single-engined piston helicopters